Out of the Mist (German title: Der Sohn der Hagar) is a 1927 German silent drama film directed by Fritz Wendhausen and starring Mady Christians, Werner Fuetterer and Lia Eibenschütz. It was shot at the Staaken Studios in Berlin. The film's sets were designed by the art directors Erich Kettelhut and Karl Vollbrecht. It was released by the German subsidiary of the Fox Film Company.

Cast
 Mady Christians as Lore  
 Werner Fuetterer as Robert Hellmich  
 Lia Eibenschütz as Christine  
 Gertrud de Lalsky as Anna Hartmann  
 Mathias Wieman as Dr. Friedlieb  
 Bruno Ziener as Jakob Hellmich  
 Auguste Prasch-Grevenberg as Gertrud Hellmich  
 Carl Theodor Klock as Berthold  
 Hermann Vallentin as Steinert  
 Vladimir Sokoloff as Poleto  
 Emil Heyse as Gottlieb Peukert  
 Paul Rehkopf as Gendarm  
 Frederick Valk 
 Max Schreck

See also
 Son Without a Home (1955)

References

Bibliography
 Grange, William. Cultural Chronicle of the Weimar Republic. Scarecrow Press, 2008.

External links

1927 films
Films of the Weimar Republic
Films directed by Fritz Wendhausen
German silent feature films
Films based on German novels
German black-and-white films
Films shot at Staaken Studios
1927 drama films
German drama films
Fox Film films
1920s German films